Nancy Drew: Girl Detective is a 2004-2012 book series which replaced the long-running Nancy Drew mystery series. This new series is written in first person narration, from Nancy's point of view, and features updated versions of the main Nancy Drew characters.  New secondary characters are introduced to populate River Heights and appear over multiple books, adding a framework to Nancy's world.

Though this series has many improvements over the Nancy Drew Mystery Stories, the drastic change in the main characters' personalities was hard for many readers to accept. The series was negatively reviewed by many fans of the series, mainly over the change in Nancy's character. In 2008, the series was changed into a trilogy format, which gained even more negative reviews than before. Simon & Schuster cut back to 4 books a year in 2010, before low sales finally forced the cancellation of the Girl Detective series in 2011. In 2013, the Nancy Drew Diaries series was launched as the replacement for Girl Detective.

History
In the 90s and early 2000s, sales of the Nancy Drew novel series began to drop. At a Nancy Drew conference held in early 2005 in New York, a Simon and Schuster representative said that the digests had been selling about 30,000 copies. In order to boost sales, the original series was ended and the Nancy Drew series re-launched.

This new incarnation of Nancy Drew was initially supervised by Bonnie Bryant (Jacobson), with three ghost writers writing the initial six books. The first volume of the new series, Without a Trace, reached the New York Times bestseller list in the Children's Series category and #113 on USA Today's Top 150 sellers list due to the .99 cents introductory price.

Differences from the original series
The publisher describes the series in the following way:

Nancy Drew in this version is a less than perfect teenage girl prone to forgetfulness, an object of jokes, and interested in other subjects over mysteries. Bess Marvin has gained skills in mechanics and computers and is no longer slightly overweight, and described as fashionable and trendy. George Fayne has become moody and sloppily dressed in this series, always more interested in tech and sarcastic retorts than solving mysteries. Bess and George also gain siblings and family members with careers. Ned now lives in River Heights, working part-time for his father's newspaper The River Heights Bugle.

Setting
The Nancy Drew: Girl Detective novels are usually based in the fictional town of River Heights, which is located in Illinois. Other fictional cities that are mentioned are Silver Creek, East Bank, Cutler Falls, and Trib Falls, which are all near River Heights and the Muskoka River. River Heights is a 1-hour drive west of the real city, Chicago, which has been mentioned frequently.

Main characters
 Nancy Drew is an 18-year-old young woman who lives with her father in River Heights. When she was only 3 years old, her mother died, something with which she has had trouble coming to terms. She and her two best friends Bess and George and boyfriend Ned Nickerson solve mysteries in River Heights and places they visit. Nancy is confident, determined (which her dad calls a 'stubborn streak'), and sometimes forgetful when thinking about a case, but her friends help her out so she stays on track. Nancy has shoulder-length, strawberry blond hair, blue eyes, and is said to be 5'8". She thinks style is okay but prefers comfort.
 Georgia "George" Fayne, is one of Nancy's best friends. She is an athletic tomboy who is really good with modern technology. She has brown eyes, short brown hair and is tall and thin and does not care about fashion at all.  Unlike the original series, George is also now characterized as a sarcastic pessimist.
 Bess Marvin is Nancy's other best friend and George's cousin, though they don't have much in common except their friendship to Nancy. Bess is flirty and, according to Nancy, seems perfect in every way. She has blue eyes, blond hair, and curves, unlike her cousin George, who has brown eyes, short brown hair, and is skinny. In Murder on the Set, Bess is said to be 5'2".
 Ned Nickerson is Nancy's boyfriend. He sometimes comes along with Nancy on her cases. Ned is in college and tends to be casual. He works for his father's newspaper, the River Heights Bugle. In Murder on the Set, Ned is said to be 6'1".
 Carson Drew, Nancy's father, is a lawyer. He is famous in River Heights for being good at solving crimes, a gift he passed down to his daughter. He will sometimes refer small cases his clients have to his daughter. In False Notes, he celebrates his birthday.
 Hannah Gruen has been living with the Drew family ever since Nancy's mother died. Hannah is their housekeeper and is like a member of the family.  She is protective of Nancy, sometimes even when she is working on a case.
 Deirdre Shannon is Nancy's nemesis and former classmate. Deirdre's father, like Nancy's, is also a lawyer in River Heights. However, Deirdre is an obnoxious, spoiled brat, and frequently being compared to Nancy by her parents. Thus, Deirdre is jealous of Nancy, and the two's rivalry can be traced back to the first grade. Deirdre hates her grade school nickname, DeeDee, and becomes irritated if called by that; thus, George Fayne often refers to her in that way. She has a not-so-subtle big crush on Ned Nickerson, even though he is dating Nancy. With her black hair, green eyes and pale skin, she looks like a Cruella de Vil II. In Murder on the Set she is mistakenly named "Dierdre Simmons".
 Chief Pete McGinnis is the local police chief. Unlike the old Nancy Drew stories, in which he and Nancy had a friendly relationship, their relationship is more antagonistic in the new series. Nancy beats him to crime scenes and solves mysteries before him, so he is jealous of her success. In Fishing for Clues, his first name is revealed to be Pete.
 Harold Safer is Nancy's neighbor. He owns the town's cheese shop, and likes sunsets and Broadway musicals. In the first book, Without a Trace, Harold is accused of smashing a zucchini patch. Nancy and her friends help him prove his innocence. In Lights, Camera... and Action!, he co-stars with Nancy on a TV movie being shot in River Heights.
 Charlie Adams works at Carr's Garage, and is a friend of Nancy. He often doesn't charge Nancy, because he is in love with her (though those feelings are not reciprocated). In Pit of Vipers, Nancy is surprised to discover he is a snake collector, when he gets arrested on suspicion of stealing a snake from the local zoo.
 Luther Eldridge (originally Atchinson) is an expert on River Heights history and he often helps Nancy on her cases. Nancy likes spending time with Luther because she can learn interesting things from him. She was a friend of his daughter, but Luther's entire family died in a car accident when Nancy was still young; afterwards, Luther quit his job while struggling with depression.
 Mrs. Mahoney is the wealthiest person in River Heights, and the owner of Rackham Industries. Her husband Julius's ancestors were a part of the Rackham Gang, who committed the infamous River Heights Heist and escaped with the money on the Muskoka River (as explained in Action!). While she is very charitable and kind, her late husband is described as the complete opposite.

List of books in the series
Books in the Nancy Drew: Girl Detective are released in paperback format by Simon & Schuster. From 2008 to 2012, the mysteries were presented as 3-book mini arcs, drawing the mystery out over three distinct, but linked, titles. The re-designed covers feature model Jessica Silverman as Nancy Drew.

Regular Series

Trilogy Series

Girl Detective Super Mysteries

Spin-offs

Nancy Drew and the Clue Crew
Starting in 2006, Aladdin Paperbacks published a new series to replace the Nancy Drew Notebooks series for younger readers; it exists in the same universe as the Nancy Drew: Girl Detective series.

It features Nancy Drew, George Fayne, and Bess Marvin as eight-year-olds in the third grade at River Heights Elementary School, and solving kid sized mysteries, from finding a stolen ice cream formula entry to the culprit who cut the cake before the bride.  This series also sets George's mother working her own catering company, and reveals George's real name to be Georgia. This series ended in 2015 to be replaced by the Nancy Drew Clue Book series.

Nancy Drew and the Hardy Boys Super Mystery
A crossover spin-off series with The Hardy Boys: Undercover Brothers series. The stories are told in first person, alternating chapters, between Frank's or Joe's, and Nancy's perspective. The first title in the series acts as an introduction between the characters. This series published one title per year until the end of the Girl Detective and Undercover Brothers series in 2012.

Graphic novels
Beginning in 2005, Papercutz began issuing a new series of Nancy Drew graphic novels as an offshoot of the Girl Detective series. The series is edited by Jim Salicrup, written by Stefan Petrucha, and illustrated by Sho Murase. All the storylines are completely new. The manga-style illustrations and technical allusions (Nancy's hybrid car, George's tablet PC) give Nancy and her friends a 21st-century spin.

There are several nods and tie-ins to other Nancy Drew media. In The Old Fashioned Mystery of The Haunted Dollhouse, the citizens of River Heights dresses up as if they were in the 1930s to celebrate an event. In Global Warming, Dr. Craven from Her Interactive's PC game The Creature of Kapu Cave appears. The Dana Girls and their friends appear in both High School Musical Mystery and High School Musical Mystery Part 2: The Lost Verse, initially as rivals to Nancy, though they eventually team up to solve the mystery.

The series also has continuity, and several multi-issue cases. Issues #9-11 (Ghost in the Machinery, The Disoriented Express, Monkey-Wrench Blues) form "The High Miles Mystery" trilogy; Issues #17 and #18 (Night of the Living Chatchke and City Under the Basement) form a two-part storyline; and Issues #20 and #21 (High School Musical Mystery and High School Musical Mystery Part 2: The Lost Verse) form The High School Musical Mystery, which also features fellow Stratemeyer Syndicate series The Dana Girls.

In 2010, the series was rebooted as Nancy Drew: Girl Detective - The New Case Files. These new novels center around a River Heights that has become obsessed with vampire books. The third novel of this new series, Together with the Hardy Boys, featured a crossover with The Hardy Boys, who also had their own graphic novel series at that time. This ended up being the last issue, and the series was cancelled after that. In 2014, the series began being re-released as an offshoot of the new Nancy Drew Diaries series, containing two volumes per issue.

See also

The Hardy Boys: Undercover Brothers, reboot of The Hardy Boys series, with which Girl Detective had a spin-off crossover series

References

Young adult novel series
Nancy Drew books
Simon & Schuster books